The Princess of Temple is a 2003 Hong Kong romantic comedy film directed by Ching Fung and starring Michael Tse and Tiffany Lee. The film was later re-issued as Laughing Lovers after Tse's successful portrayal of "Laughing Gor" in the 2009 TVB series E.U..

Plot
Ever since little, Wilford (Michael Tse) has been suffering from mysophobia. Even his longtime girlfriend Flan (Belinda Hamnett) cannot stand him and dumped him. While he is feeling all sad, his friends bring him to Temple Street where steps in for the first time ever. There, he bumps into "The Princess of Temple Street" Sue (Tiffany Lee). As Wilford spends time with Sue, his mysophobia goes away and also develops a relationship with her. Things were going on pretty well until Flan returns.

Cast
Michael Tse as Wilford
Tiffany Lee as Sue
Belinda Hamnett as Flan
Law Kar-ying
Kingdom Yuen as Kiu
Lee Fung

External links

 The Princess Of Temple Street at Hong Kong Cinemagic

2003 films
2003 romantic comedy-drama films
Hong Kong romantic comedy-drama films
2000s Cantonese-language films
Films set in Hong Kong
Films shot in Hong Kong
2000s Hong Kong films